Ballencrieff railway station served the community of Ballencrieff, East Lothian, Scotland from 1846 to 1847 on the North British Railway Main Line.

History 
The station opened on 22 June 1846 by the North British Railway. It was probably situated north of Ballencrieff Farm. There was a siding to the south which outlasted the station, being removed in 1959. The station was very short-lived, closing 15 months later on 1 November 1847.

References

External links 

Former North British Railway stations
Railway stations in Great Britain opened in 1846
Railway stations in Great Britain closed in 1847
1846 establishments in Scotland
1847 disestablishments in Scotland